Great Salt Pond may refer to:
 
Great Salt Pond, a lake in Saint Kitts and Nevis, in the Caribbean
Great Salt Pond, Sint Maarten, in the Caribbean
Great Salt Pond Archeological District, Rhode Island, USA

See also
Great Salt Lake
Salt pond (disambiguation)